George Thomas Brewster (1862–1943) was an American sculptor and architectural sculptor, known for his portraits and war memorials. Brewster taught modeling at Cooper Union, beginning in 1900; at the Art Students League of New York, beginning in 1886; and at the Rhode Island School of Design, in 1893 and 1894.

Life and education
Brewster was born on February 24, 1862, in Kingston, Massachusetts. He studied first at the Massachusetts State Normal Art School in Boston, and then for three years at the Ecole des Beaux Arts in Paris, France.  His teachers there included Augustin Dumont and Antonin Mercie.

Selected works
Victory (finial figure), architectural sculpture, Indiana Soldiers' and Sailors' Monument, Indianapolis, Indiana, 1897-1902.
Stephen Decatur, Dewey Triumphal Arch, New York City, 1899 (destroyed).
Independent Man (finial figure), atop Rhode Island State House, Providence, Rhode Island, 1899-1900.
Protection of the Flag, Village Green, Athens, Pennsylvania, 1902.
Portrait medallions on exterior of Saint Louis Art Museum, Saint Louis, Missouri, 1904.
Bas-relief portrait of Augustus Saint-Gaudens, National Portrait Gallery, Washington, D.C., 1904.
Greek Drama and Greek State, statues on exterior of Brooklyn Museum, Brooklyn, New York City, 1907-09.
Equestrian statue of William Penn Hussey, New England Home for the Deaf, Danvers, Massachusetts, 1913.
Patrick Walsh, Barrett Plaza, Augusta, Georgia, 1913.
Alexander Hamilton - 1793, Hamilton College, Clinton, New York, 1918.
Soldiers and Sailors Monument, Plymouth, Pennsylvania, dedicated in 1920.
Thomas Redfield Proctor Monument, Roscoe Cankling Park, Utica, New York, 1921.
Portrait bust of Robert E. Lee, Hall of Fame for Great Americans, Bronx Community College, Bronx, New York City, 1923.

Works in the Vicksburg National Military Park

Lieut. Col. Sidney H. Griffin (1919)
Brig. Gen. John W. Whitfield (1913)
Brig. Gen. Elias S. Dennis (1915)
Brig. Gen. States Rights Gist (1915)
Brig. Gen. Alvin P. Hovey (1915)
Brig. Gen. Nathan Kimball  (1915)
Maj. Gen. Dabney H. Maury (1915)  one of the monuments vandalized in 2003
Brig. Gen. William Vandever (1915)
Col. Eugene Erwin (1916)
Brig. Gen. Thomas E. G. Ransom (1916)
Lt. Col. Melancthon Smith (1916)
Capt. Patrick H. White (1917)
Maj. Alexander Yates (1917)
Maj. Joseph W. Anderson (1919)
Col. Skidmore Harris (1919)
Col. Randal MacGavock (1919)
Lieut. Col. Madison Rogers (1919)
Maj. Gen. Cadwallader Washburn (1919)
Maj. Robert B. Campbell (1920)
Capt. Toby Hart (1921), one of the monuments vandalized in 2003
Lieut. Col. L. L. McLaurin (1921)
Maj. Frederick N. Ogden (1921)
Gov. Oliver P. Morton (1926)

Gallery

Relief portraits at Vicksburg National Military Park

References

1862 births
1943 deaths
20th-century American sculptors
20th-century male artists
19th-century American sculptors
American male sculptors
Rhode Island School of Design faculty
Cooper Union faculty